The following are the national records in Olympic weightlifting in Latvia. Records are maintained in each weight class for the snatch lift, clean and jerk lift, and the total for both lifts by the Weightlifting Federation of Latvia (Latvijas Svarcelšanas Federācija).

Men

Women

References
General
Latvian records 
Specific

External links
LSF web site

records
Latvia
Latvian records
weightlifting